Dragutin "Dragiša" S. Milutinović (Belgrade, Principality of Serbia, 29 November 1840 - Pančevo, Kingdom of Serbia, 16 December 1900), son of Sima Milutinović Sarajlija, was an engineer, an architect and art historian, a professor at the Grandes écoles, and a member of the Serbian Academy of Sciences and Arts. He collaborated on several research sites in Serbia with architect Mihailo Valtrović.

Biography

He studied civil engineering in Berlin, Munich and the Karlsruhe Institute of Technology. He worked in Serbia at the Ministry of Construction. In collaboration with Mihailo Valtrović, he recorded and studied Serbian medieval monuments from 1871-1884.

His projects include several types of small churches, engineering work on cutting the new Belgrade-Aleksinac railroad for the Serbian Railways, as well as the Belgrade Main railway station (1884). He made the urban plan of the new town of Danilovgrad in Montenegro; he designed private buildings and iconostasis for the church of St. George in Novi Sad; in Dolovo near Pančevo, etc.

See also
 Jovan Ilkić
 Nikola Nestorović
 Milan Kapetanović
 Andra Stevanović
 Dimitrije T. Leko
 Dragutin Đorđević
 Andrija Vuković
 Petar Bajalović
 Đura Bajalović
 Dragutin Maslać
 Krstić Brothers

References 

1840 births
1900 deaths
Serbian engineers
Serbian architects
Serbian Academy of Sciences and Arts